Rhopobota jonesiana is a species of moth of the family Tortricidae first described by Józef Razowski in 2013. It is found on Seram Island in Indonesia. The habitat consists of lower montane forests.

The wingspan is about 12 mm. The forewings are greyish cream, but creamish postmedially and suffused with grey in the apical third. The strigulation (fine streaks) is grey brown. The hindwings are brownish.

Etymology
The species is named for David T. Jones, who collected the species.

References

Moths described in 2013
Eucosmini